Nation TV is the first 24-hour news television channel in Thailand, owned by Nation TV Co., Ltd., a subsidiary of Nation Group.

History

Earlier History 

Nation TV launched in 2000 as Nation Channel on UBC (now TrueVisions) platform on channel 8.

On 1 May 2003, Nation Channel exited UBC and moved to Tai TV (TTV) platform, broadcast via MMDS on channel 1.

Digital Terrestrial Television 

On 27 December 2013, NBC Next Vision won the auction for a digital news channel on channel number 22. On 17 March 2014, the channel name was changed to Nation TV and updated the logo to be more modern. On 1 April 2014, Nation TV started broadcast on digital terrestrial television via TV5 MUX5.

On 1 January 2015, Nation TV has changed its identity again. It's the letter N in a circle, floating above the letter Nation, which comes from its original identity, but remove the globe. It was also adjusting the aspect ratio to 16:9 like other digital TV stations, but in some cases, for example, the image in the transmission room is still in the same 4:3 aspect ratio until the transmission room of the station is moved to the transmission room at The Coast Lifestyle Mall, Bangna District, Bangkok (Currently discontinued broadcasting at The Coast Bangna and return the space to the operator for rent), as well as purchasing new equipment and broadcasting systems at the main transmission room of the Interlink Building. Therefore, all Nation TV programs are broadcast in the aspect ratio of 16:9. Later, on January 9, 2020, Nation TV has changed its logo again for modernity with a separate beak added from the upper left corner of the letter N, similar to the number 1.

After NMG ownership changed, Nation TV is well-known for Far-Right political coverage and frequently criticized opposition factions such as Future Forward Party.

On 10 November 2020, Nation TV announced a new direction for the station to return to neutral news reports, such as when the station started. After the news team with ideology about dictatorship politics gradually resigned from the station.

Newscaster

Current

Former

Identity

Logos

Slogans
 2000-2001: เนชั่นแชนแนล ที่นี่ที่เดียวเท่านั้น (Only Here on Nation Channel) / เนชั่นแชนแนล ตอบทุกคำถามที่คุณอยากรู้ (Nation Channel, Answer All the Questions You Want to Know) / เนชั่นแชนแนล สถานีข่าว 24 ชั่วโมง ที่นี่...แห่งเดียวเท่านั้น (Only Here on Nation Channel, The 24-hour News Station) / เนชั่นแชนแนล ไม่พลาดทุกเหตุการณ์สำคัญ (Nation Channel, Don't Miss Every Important Event) / Nation Channel, All the News, All the Time
 2001-2003: เนชั่นแชนแนล สถานีข่าว 24 ชั่วโมง แห่งแรกของคนไทย (Nation Channel, The First 24-hour News Station for Thai People)
 2012-2014: เนชั่นแชนแนล ในสนามข่าว "เรา" คือตัวจริง (Nation Channel, In the News Arena, We Are the Real)
 2014-present: เนชั่นทีวี ทุกสนามข่าว "เรา" คือตัวจริง (Nation TV, Every News Arena, We Are the Real)
 2018-present: ดูเนชั่น กด 22 (Watch Nation, Press Channel Number 22)
 2020: ทันทุกข่าวไปพร้อมกับเรา (Catch-Up Every News Along with Us)
 2020-2022: ชัดทุกเนื้อหา รอบด้านทุกการนำเสนอ (Clear All Quality, Move All Around the Presentation)

References

External links

Nation Group
24-hour television news channels in Thailand
24-hour television news channels
Television stations in Thailand